Matthew DeLisi (born March 28, 2000), better known as super or supertf, is an American former professional Overwatch player. During his career, he played in the Overwatch League (OWL) for the San Francisco Shock, and prior to OWL's inception, he played for Bird Noises, Hammer Esports, and Luminosity Gaming Evil (LGE).

A native of Philadelphia, Pennsylvania, DeLisi began his Overwatch career playing on team Bird Noises before joining Hammer Esports in early 2017. Shortly after, he was a part of LGE, after LGE acquired Hammer Esports. DeLisi signed with the San Francisco Shock in late 2017, ahead of the OWL's inaugural season. Underage at the beginning of the season, he made his professional debut in April 2018. While with the Shock, DeLisi became a two-time OWL All-Star, was named an OWL Role Star, was an OWL MVP finalist, won three midseason tournament titles, and won two OWL championships, in 2019 and 2020, and won the 2019 Overwatch World Cup as a part of Team USA. DeLisi announced his retirement on March 27, 2022.

DeLisi was one of the most prominent players in the league, appearing twice on The Tonight Show Starring Jimmy Fallon for interviews regarding the OWL.

Early life
DeLisi was born on March 28, 2000, and was raised in Northeast Philadelphia, Pennsylvania.

Professional career

Early career
DeLisi began his competitive esports career playing the game Team Fortress 2 with the team Bird Noises. Shortly after joining, Bird Noises changed from competing in Team Fortress 2 to competing in Overwatch, with DeLisi mainly playing as the tank character Reinhardt. In January 2017, the entire Bird Noises roster was signed by Hammer Esports, and six weeks later, Hammer Esports was acquired by Luminosity Gaming Evil (LGE). From January to August, LGE won the CyberPowerPC 2017 Extreme Gaming Series minor, came in second at the Overwatch Carbon Series major, and qualified for Overwatch Contenders (OWC) 2017 Season Zero. In OWC, the team fell in the quarterfinals match. In August 2017, LGE disbanded, as many of their players were expected to sign to teams of the upcoming Overwatch League (OWL).

San Francisco Shock
On September 28, 2017, NRG Esports announced that DeLisi had signed to the roster of their San Francisco-based OWL team, later revealed as the San Francisco Shock. At the time of signing, DeLisi was underage and was not eligible to play until March 2018. DeLisi made his OWL debut on April 5, 2018, in a 3–1 win over the Los Angeles Gladiators. The Shock had an improved win rate in the second half of the season with DeLisi and teammate Jay "sinatraa" Won becoming eligible to play, finishing the second half of the season with a 11–9 record.

Through the first three stages of the 2019 season, the most prominent team composition, known as the meta, in the OWL consisted of running three tanks and three supports. As a Reinhardt player, DeLisi excelled in this meta, having the fewest deaths of any OWL player at various times throughout the season. As a team, the Shock went on to win the Stage 2 playoffs and finished as the runners-up in the Stage 1 and Stage 3 playoffs. In Stage 4 of the season, the league implemented an enforced 2-2-2 role lock, where teams must use a team composition of two damage, two tank, and two support characters. The new rule changed the team composition meta, causing DeLisi to be benched for a majority of the remainder of the season. Delisi made an appearance in the playoffs against the London Spitfire – a match in which they won, and the Shock went on to defeat the Vancouver Titans in the Grand Finals.

DeLisi received numerous multiple accolades for his performance throughout the 2019 season. He was named a 2019 All-Star, awarded a Tank Role Star commendation, a roster voted on by OWL general managers, coaches, broadcast talent, and the media, and was a finalist for the 2019 Overwatch League Most Valuable Player award.

DeLisi's playing time at the beginning of the 2020 season was limited due to the Orisa and Winston being the primarily run tanks in the league. The Shock advanced to the finals of the season's first midseason tournament, the May Melee; the Shock defeated the Florida Mayhem in the finals match, with DeLisi adopting an aggressive playstyle in several maps. In the Countdown Cup qualifiers, the third midseason tournament of the season, Genji became a popular damage character for team compositions, and with the Shock without a dedicated Genji player on their roster, DeLisi filled the position against the Boston Uprising, The Shock defeated the Philadelphia Fusion in the Countdown Cup finals, with DeLisi subbing in as the team's main tank Reinhardt at points in the match. Despite his lack of playing time, DeLisi was selected to play in the North America All-Star Game for the second consecutive season.

In the playoffs, the meta had shifted to tank hero Roadhog being a strong character to play, and DeLisi was substituted back into the starting roster mainly playing as Roadhog throughout the playoffs. The Shock advanced to the Grand Finals bracket as North America's top seed, and after defeating the Shanghai Dragons in the upper bracket finals, they faced the Seoul Dynasty in the Grand Finals. In the finals against the Dynasty, DeLisi almost exclusively played as Roadhog, as he and the team went on to defeat Seoul and claim their second OWL championship.

On March 27, 2022, a month before the beginning of the 2022 season, DeLisi announced his retirement from professional Overwatch, citing that the preparation for the upcoming season was "wrecking [him] emotionally and mentally."

National team career
DeLisi was selected to participate in the 2019 Overwatch World Cup (OWWC) as a member of Team USA. Playing as Orisa throughout the World Cup, a hero he had rarely played in OWL, he and Team USA moved past the group stages and faced the three-time reigning champions Team South Korea in the semifinals. The team defeated Team South Korea, 3–1, to advance to the finals against Team China. Team USA swept Team China, 3–0, in the finals to claim their first OWWC title. With the win, DeLisi became one of four players to win both OWL and OWWC titles.

Esports ambassador
In October 2019, after winning their first OWL title, DeLisi and teammate Jay "Sinatraa" Won appeared on The Tonight Show Starring Jimmy Fallon, becoming the second and third esports professionals to appear on the show. Throughout season three, DeLisi became a de facto representative of the league, consistently representing Shock in OWL interviews and developing a dedicated following of fans. He made a second appearance on The Tonight Show the in October 2020 after the Shock won their second OWL title.

Awards and nominations

References

External links
Career statistics and player information from the Overwatch League.

2000 births
American esports players
Living people
People from Philadelphia
Luminosity Gaming players
San Francisco Shock players